Zlobin is a Russian male surname originating from the word zloba meaning malice; its feminine counterpart is Zlobina. It may refer to:
Anton Zlobin (born 1993), Russian ice hockey forward
Nikolai Zlobin (born 1958), Russian journalist
Nikolai Zlobin (footballer) (born 1996), Russian football player
Sergey Zlobin (born 1970), Russian racing driver
Vladimir Zlobin (1894–1967), Russian poet
Julia Zlobina (born 1989), Russian ice dancer

References

Russian-language surnames